Birchington-on-Sea is a village in the Thanet district in Kent, England, with a population of 9,961.

The village forms part of the civil parish of Birchington. It lies on the coast facing the North Sea, east of the Thames Estuary, between the seaside resorts of Herne Bay and Margate. As a seaside resort, the village is a tourist and retirement destination. The village's Minnis Bay is a family beach with attractions such as sailing, windsurfing, a paddling pool and coastal walking routes. Its three smaller beaches are surrounded by chalk cliffs, cliff stacks and caves.

The village was first recorded in 1240. Its parish church, All Saints', dates to the 13th century and its churchyard is the burial place of the 19th-century Pre-Raphaelite artist Dante Gabriel Rossetti. Quex Park, a local 19th century manor house, is home to the Powell-Cotton Museum and a twelve-bell tower built for change ringing.

The museum contains a large collection of stuffed exotic animals collected by Major Percy Powell-Cotton on his travels in Africa, and also houses artefacts unearthed in and around Birchington by his daughter, Antoinette Powell-Cotton, a keen archaeologist.

History 
Birchington was first recorded in 1240 as Birchenton, a name derived from the Old English words '', meaning a farm where birch trees grow. Archaeological evidence has shown the area was inhabited before the existence of the village: Roman and prehistoric artefacts have been discovered in the area, and Minnis Bay was once the site of an Iron Age settlement.

Archives show the village's All Saints' Church dates to around 1350. In the early 15th century, Quex Park manor house—named after the park's second owner, John Quek—was built just south of the village. The ownership of the manor passed to various families until 1770 when it was acquired by the present owners, the Powell family. In the late 17th century, the house was visited by King William III.

In 1565, a report on the coast of Thanet by the commissioners of Queen Elizabeth I stated that Birchington had 42 houses and did not have an active port. Before the 19th century, the village coastline was frequented by smugglers, leading to skirmishes between them and excise officers. Several of the older houses in the village contain cellars and bricked up tunnels, once used for storing contraband.

The 1801 census recorded the village's population as 537.

In the early 19th century, the Tudor Quex House had to be demolished and a replacement manor house was built in its place. In 1818, the Waterloo Tower was built on the grounds of Quex Park. It is a bell tower built by the owner of Quex Park, John Powell Powell, who had an interest in change ringing. Waterloo Tower was the first twelve-bell tower in Kent. The village was a farming community until the late 19th century, when it began to develop into a coastal resort.

Birchington railway station was opened in 1863 and the Railway Hotel, now the Sea View Hotel pub, was opened in 1865. Station Road was subsequently built to serve as Birchington's main shopping street. Coast Guard cottages were built at Minnis Bay in the 1870s and the first shops appeared by the bay in 1903.

Geography 

Birchington-on-Sea is located at  (51.377, 1.305) in northeast Kent, on the coast of the Thames Estuary. The village is 14 kilometres (9 mi) to the east of Herne Bay and 6 kilometres (4 mi) to the west of Margate. The small town of Westgate-on-Sea lies between Birchington and Margate.

The village is built beside four partly sandy bays; Minnis Bay to the west, Grenham Bay and Beresford Gap towards the centre and Epple Bay to the east. The village is situated on the Isle of Thanet, which was a separate island from mainland Kent until around two hundred years ago, when the channel in between became silted up. The area to the west of the village, between Birchington and Herne Bay, was once part of the channel and is now low-lying marshland. In the east of the village the land rises, forming chalk cliffs and cliff stacks around the beaches at Grenham Bay, Beresford Gap and Epple Bay. A sea wall stretches along the foot of the cliffs to prevent further erosion. The geology of Thanet consists mainly of chalk, deposited when the area was below the sea. Isle of Thanet became exposed above sea-level once the English Channel broke through between Kent and France, causing the sea-level to fall. The whole of the northeast Kent coast has been designated a Site of Special Scientific Interest.

The drinking water in the village is classed as being 'very hard', having just over 120 mg of calcium per litre. The hardness is due to water being obtained from underground chalk sources by the water company Southern Water.

Climate 
In East Kent, the warmest time of the year is July and August, when maximum temperatures average around 21 °C (70 °F). The coolest time of the year is January and February, when minimum temperatures average around 1 °C (34 °F). East Kent's average maximum and minimum temperatures are around 1/2 °C higher than the national average. East Kent's average annual rainfall is about 728 millimetres (29 in), with October to January being the wettest months. The national average annual rainfall is about 838 millimetres (33 in).

Demography 

At the 2011 census, the village had 9,961 residents. There were 4,944 households, of which 43.6% were married couples living together, 13.0% were cohabiting couples; 43.4% of all households were made up of lone individuals. For every 100 females, there were 86.2 males. The age distribution was 6% aged 0–4 years, 13.1% aged 5–15 years, 5.1% aged 16–19 years, 28.2% aged 20–44 years, 26.4% aged 45–64 years and 21.2% aged 65 years and over.

The village had a high percentage of residents over 65, compared with the national average of 16.4%.  The ethnicity of the village was predominately white, with over 95% of its residents being born in the United Kingdom and other Western European countries. About 61% of residents claimed to be Christian, with less than 1% claiming to be Buddhist, Jewish, Hindu or an alternative religion, while 7.4% did not state their religion, and 28.6% claimed no religious affiliation.

Economy 

At the 2011 UK census, the economic activity of residents in the village aged 16–74 was 31.7% in full-time employment, 14.4% in part-time employment, 10.1% self-employed, 5.7% unemployed, 3.0% students with jobs, 4.3% students without jobs, 18.2% retired, 4.9% looking after home or family, 5.5% permanently sick or disabled and 2.1% economically inactive for other reasons. The percentage of retired people was significantly higher than the national figure of 13.7%.  20.6% of the village's residents aged 16–74 had Level 4 qualification or higher, compared to 27.3% nationwide. According to Office for National Statistics estimates, during the period of April 2001 to March 2002 the average gross weekly income of households in the Birchington-on-Sea electoral wards was £460 (£23,986 per year).

The industry of employment of residents in 2011 was 16.1% retail, 17.2% health and social work, 5.8% manufacturing, 12.3% education, 1.3% real estate, 9.6% construction, 4.9% transport and storage, 2.2% communications, 6.7% public administration, 4.3% hotels and restaurants, 3.1% finance, 0.8% agriculture, 1.1% energy and water supply, and 5.2% other community, social or personal services. Compared to national figures, the village had a relatively high number of workers in the construction and health/social care industries and a relatively low number in manufacturing. Many residents commute to work outside the town; at the 2001 census, the town had 3,370 employed residents, but only 1,711 jobs.

As a seaside resort, the village has an economy based around tourism, with several hotels, caravan parks and leisure attractions. The village shopping centre attracts walk-in trade from tourists. One of the largest retailers is the Co-Op (formerly Somerfield) supermarket. The elderly population of the village has generated health and social care jobs at local care homes and at the Birchington Medical Centre. At the 2001 census, 1.4% of the village's population resided in a medical or care establishment, compared to the national average of only 0.8%.

Culture 

Minnis Bay is a popular family beach with attractions such as sailing, windsurfing, cafes, beach huts, public houses, restaurants, a children's playground, a paddling pool and coastal walking/cycling routes. The beach has gained a European Blue Flag Award for its cleanliness and safety. The village has three other smaller beaches, which are surrounded by chalk cliffs and cliff stacks. Wildlife that can be observed in the Thames Estuary includes seals, velvet swimming crabs and the migrant turnstone.

Paintings by local artists are displayed at the David Burley Gallery in Birchington Library. 

Community activities take place at the Birchington Village Centre, including adult education classes, drama productions by the Birchington Guild of Players and concerts by the Birchington Silver Band. 

In 1989, Birchington-on-Sea was twinned with the town of La Chapelle d'Armentieres, near Lille in northern France; Birchington Twinning Association arranges events between the two communities, such as school trips, concerts and war remembrance services. 

Since 1932, Birchington has held a street carnival each summer.

Sport 

Several teams compete in local leagues: the Birchington United Services Club runs a football team in the Thanet Sunday Football League Premier Division and a netball team in the Thanet and District Netball League, while Birchington Chess Club competes in the Thanet League.  

Westgate and Birchington Golf Club has an 18-hole  course on the cliff tops between Westgate and Birchington.

Birchington Bridge Club meets twice a week at the Our Lady and St Benedict's Church Hall. A football pitch is provided at the council owned Birchington Recreation Ground.

As a seaside resort, the village has several clubs for watersports. Minnis Bay Sailing Club, founded in 1950, is a dinghy and catamaran club where members can sail for fun, but competitions are also held most weekends. Speed boats, jet skis and water skis can be launched near the beach at Beresford Gap by members of Beresford Wakeboard and Water Ski Club, which was established in 2004 to help alleviate anti-social behaviour in the area. Anglers are catered for by Birchington Sea Angling Society.

Media 
There are two local weekly newspapers providing news on the Thanet district area. Isle Of Thanet KM Extra is a free newspaper, while Isle of Thanet Gazette is paid-for. Isle Of Thanet KM Extra is owned by the KM Group, Isle of Thanet Gazette is owned by Trinity Mirror. There are two local newsmagazines produced for the people of Birchington: The Birchington Roundabout, which began publishing in April 2003, and The Birchington Forum. KMFM Thanet is a radio station on frequency 107.2FM, owned by the KM Group. Community radio station Academy FM (Thanet) launched in 2010 on 107.8FM.

Children and young people 
For a lot of years, there have been a mixture of different groups for the young people and children of the village. Brownies, Girl Guides and Scouts have a large membership.
There is mention of a youth club in Birchington since the 1960s; simply referred to as 'Birchington Youth Club'. After many changes, the youth club name was changed to 'Target Youth Hub' in 2017. It is run by a local group and headed up by the Youth Worker who has been involved since 2007.

Quex House and Park 

Several rooms, decorated with oriental and English period furniture, are open to visitors, and guided tours are provided. The Powell-Cotton Museum houses three galleries of stuffed animal displays, depicting more than 500 African and Asian animals against their natural habitats.

Further galleries display a vast collection of African artefacts, European firearms, European and Asian cutting weapons, European and Chinese porcelain, and important archaeological finds from Thanet and East Kent. The total number of artefacts has not been counted, though the ethnography items alone total approximately 18,000.

Percy Powell-Cotton was born in 1866, and was a Major in the Northumberland Fusiliers. His expeditions were conducted for scientific research, and would sometimes take 18 months. In 1896, Major Powell-Cotton founded the Powell-Cotton Museum at Quex Park to display his collection of mammals and artefacts acquired on his expeditions to Africa and Asia. The animals were mounted by the noted taxidermist Rowland Ward.

During World War I, Quex House became an Auxiliary Military Hospital run by the Birchington Voluntary Aid Detachment. In 1923, the Memorial Ground was donated to the village by Mr H. A. Erlebach for sport and recreational use. Mr Erlebach owned the village's now defunct Woodfood House School and purchased land from the Quex House estate for the school. He gave the southern part of the land to the people of Birchington and dedicated it in memory of his three sons who had been killed in World War I. The land is now owned by Thanet District Council.

Politics 
Since 1983, the Member of Parliament for North Thanet, covering northern Thanet and Herne Bay, has been the Conservative Roger Gale. At the 2015 general election, in North Thanet the Conservatives won a majority of 10,948 and 49.0% of the vote. The UK Independence Party won 25.7% of the vote, Labour 17.9%, the Green Party 3.7%, the Liberal Democrats 3.5% and the Party for a United Thanet 0.3%.

Birchington-on-Sea is in the Thanet local government district. The village's electoral wards of Birchington North and Birchington South have five of the fifty six seats on the Thanet District Council. At the 2007 local elections, all five of those seats were held by the Conservative Party. The village has its own civil parish, the lowest unit of local government. Birchington Parish Council has ten members and deals with issues specifically affecting Birchington.

Education 
Birchington-on-Sea's secondary school is the secondary modern King Ethelbert School. In 2006, it had around 750 pupils and was seeking government support to become a specialist visual arts school. In 2005, 15 percent of its pupils gained at least five GCSEs at grades A*–C including English and maths, ranking it 103rd out of 120 Kent secondary schools. The school failed the 30% GCSE target. Many secondary students living in Birchington-on-Sea commute to schools in nearby towns, especially to the grammar schools in Ramsgate and Broadstairs. The village's primary school is Birchington Church of England Primary School, which is a state school owned by the Church of England but run by Kent County Council. In 2006, the school's Key Stage 2 performances ranked 340th out of 386 Kent state primary schools.

Transport 

Birchington-on-Sea railway station is on the Chatham Main Line which runs between Ramsgate in East Kent and London Victoria. Other stations on this line include Broadstairs, Margate, Herne Bay, Faversham, Gillingham, Chatham, Rochester and Bromley South. Birchington is around 1 hour and 40 minutes from London by Mainline train. A National Express coach service also runs between London Victoria Coach Station and Ramsgate via Birchington-on-Sea. A selection of early morning and evening trains run on weekdays to London's Cannon Street station and high speed services to St Pancras International, primarily for business commuting.

There are Stagecoach South East bus services running to Westgate-on-Sea, Margate, Broadstairs, Canterbury and Herne Bay. The A28 road runs between Hastings and Margate via Ashford, Canterbury, Birchington and Westgate-on-Sea. 3 miles (5 km) southwest of Birchington-on-Sea, the A28 crosses the A299 road which leads along North Kent towards London, becoming the M2 motorway at Faversham.

Notable residents 
Residents of Birchington-on-Sea have included the British screenwriter Tudor Gates, who wrote a number of stories about female vampires for Hammer Studios in the early 1970s. Gates died in the village in January 2007. On Easter Sunday, 1882, Pre-Raphaelite illustrator, painter, translator and poet Dante Gabriel Rossetti rented a bungalow in the village, in an attempt to recuperate from ill-health. He died in April the same year and was buried in the churchyard of All Saints, under a tombstone designed by fellow artist, Ford Madox Brown.

References

External links 

 
 
 Birchington Parish Council

Villages in Kent
Beaches of Kent
Civil parishes in Kent
Populated coastal places in Kent
Seaside resorts in England